Manhattan Christian College (MCC) is a private Christian college in Manhattan, Kansas. It was founded in 1927 as Christian Workers University. The institution's name was changed to Manhattan Bible College in 1930 and Manhattan Christian College in 1971.

MCC is historically affiliated with nondenominational, independent Christian churches and churches of Christ of the Restoration Movement. While many of the students and all the professors have a background in the Christian Church/Churches of Christ congregations, students from various denominational backgrounds are encouraged and welcomed.

The college is accredited by the Higher Learning Commission and the Association for Biblical Higher Education.

Academics 
Programs of study include both single and dual-degrees (in cooperation with Kansas State University, as well as an adult degree completion program both on campus and online.

The college offers bachelor of arts or science degrees in various ministerial fields.  The Leadership Education for Adult Development (LEAD) degree completion program assists individuals interested in either Management & Ethics or Biblical Leadership, allowing them to complete a college degree for personal and career development.  MCC also offers these two degree-completion programs through online distance education.

MCC programs of study can be taken in conjunction with numerous programs at Kansas State University allowing students to earn two bachelor's degrees in five years.  Students may also choose to pursue a 2-year associate degree, or simply obtain a 1-year certificate as well.

Manhattan Christian College was granted an exception to Title IX in 2016 which allows it to legally discriminate against LGBT students for religious reasons. It is ranked among the "Absolute Worst Campuses for LGBTQ Youth" by Campus Pride.

Athletics
The college offers many sports programs including men's and women's soccer, men's and women's basketball, women's volleyball, men's baseball, and men's and women's cross country which was recently added for the Fall 2010 season. In 2014, the college changed its athletics nickname from "Crusaders" to "Thunder." The program competes in the National Christian College Athletic Association Division II and is a member of the Midwest Christian College Conference.

References

External links

Association for Biblical Higher Education
Private universities and colleges in Kansas
Education in Riley County, Kansas
Universities and colleges affiliated with the Christian churches and churches of Christ
Educational institutions established in 1927
Buildings and structures in Riley County, Kansas
Manhattan, Kansas
1927 establishments in Kansas